Braithwaite, Brathwaite, or Brathwait is an English surname of Old Norse origin. At the time of the British Census of 1881, the relative frequency of the surname Braithwaite was highest in Westmorland (37.3 times the British average), followed by Cumberland, Yorkshire, Linlithgowshire, Lancashire, County Durham, Nottinghamshire, Leicestershire, Anglesey and Flintshire. Notable people with the surname include:

Sir Albert Braithwaite (1893–1959), British politician
Althea Braithwaite (1940–2020), English children's author, illustrator, publisher and glass artist
Anna Braithwaite (1788–1859),  English Quaker minister
Bob Braithwaite (1925–2015), British trap shooter
Brenda Brathwaite (born 1966), American video game designer and developer
Carlos Brathwaite (born 1988), Barbadian cricketer
Charles Braithwaite (1850–1910), Canadian politician and agrarian leader
Chris Braithwaite aka Chris Jones (1885–1944), Barbadian seaman, leader of the Colonial Seamen's Association
Darren Braithwaite (born 1969), British sprinter
Daryl Braithwaite (born 1949), Australian pop singer
Diana Braithwaite, Canadian singer-songwriter
Donald Braithwaite (1936–2017), Welsh boxer
Doug Braithwaite British comic book artist
Edward Kamau Brathwaite (born 1930), Barbadian poet
E. R. Braithwaite (1912–2016), Guyanese novelist, writer, teacher, and diplomat
Errol Brathwaite (1924–2005), New Zealand author
Fred Brathwaite (born 1972), Canadian ice hockey player
George Braithwaite (disambiguation)
Gregory Brathwaite (born 1969), Barbadian cricket umpire
Sir Gurney Braithwaite, 1st Baronet (1895–1958), English politician
Jahron Anthony Brathwaite aka PartyNextDoor, Canadian singer, songwriter, record producer and rapper
Jeffrey Braithwaite, Australian professor in the field of health policy
Jessica Braithwaite, Australian television presenter and reporter
John Braithwaite (disambiguation)
Joseph Braithwaite (mayor) (1848–1917), New Zealand bookseller and politician, mayor of Dunedin
Joseph Bevan Braithwaite (1818–1905), English Quaker minister
Junior Braithwaite (1949–1999), Jamaican reggae musician
Keith Braithwaite, New Zealand football player and manager
Kenneth Braithwaite (born 1960), American politician, diplomat and businessman
Kraigg Brathwaite (born 1992), West Indian cricketer
Lawrence Ytzhak Braithwaite (1963–2008) Canadian novelist, spoken word artist, dub poet, essayist, digital drummer and short fiction writer
Leon Braithwaite (born 1972), English footballer
Leonard Braithwaite (1923–2012), Canadian lawyer and politician
Dame Lilian Braithwaite (1873–1948), English actress
Martin Braithwaite (born 1991), Danish footballer
Max Braithwaite (1911–1995), Canadian novelist and non-fiction author
Michael Braithwaite (born 1987), Canadian rower
Sir Nicholas Brathwaite (1925–2016), prime minister of Grenada
Nicholas Braithwaite (born 1939), English conductor 
Oyinkan Braithwaite (born 1988), Nigerian-British novelist
Ray Braithwaite (born 1933), Australian politician
Rewi Braithwaite (fl. 1920s), New Zealand football player
Richard Brathwait or Brathwaite (1588–1673), English poet
R. B. Braithwaite (1900–1990), English philosopher
Robert Braithwaite (disambiguation)
Roderick Braithwaite (1901–1963), New Zealand politician, mayor of Hamilton
Sir Rodric Braithwaite (born 1932), British diplomat and author 
Ryan Brathwaite (born 1988), Barbadian track and field athlete
Sam Hartley Braithwaite (1883–1947), British composer and artist
Stuart Braithwaite (born 1976), Scottish guitarist, bassist, drummer, singer and songwriter
Talabi Braithwaite (1928–2011), Nigerian insurance broker
Ted Braithwaite (1902–1990), English footballer
Tut Braithwaite (born 1946), British rock climber and mountaineer
Victoria Braithwaite (1967–2019), British scientist
Sir Walter Braithwaite (1865–1945), British Army general during World War I
Walter H. Braithwaite (1906–1991), English composer, pianist and teacher
Warwick Braithwaite (1896–1971), New Zealand-born British conductor
Wayne Braithwaite (born 1975), Guyanese boxer
William Charles Braithwaite (1862–1922), British Quaker historian
William Garnett Braithwaite (1870–1937), British Army general who served with New Zealand Military Forces during World War I
William Stanley Braithwaite (1878–1962), African-American poet, literary critic and scholar

In fiction 
 Edna Braithwaite, a maid in the television programme Downton Abbey
 Geoffrey Braithwaite, fictional character in Julian Barnes's novel Flaubert's Parrot
 Pandora Braithwaite, fictional character in the Adrian Mole series by British author Sue Townsend
Braithwaite family, fictional characters in At Home with the Braithwaites TV series
Braithwaite family, fictional characters in Red Dead Redemption 2 video game.
Nigel Braithwaite, AKA Roundabout, fictional character in Carmen Sandiego (TV series)

See also
 Braithwaite, a village in Cumbria, England
 Braithwaite (disambiguation)

References

English-language surnames
Surnames of English origin
English toponymic surnames